Sanggar Bay (Indonesian: Teluk Sanggar) is a major bay on the island of Sumbawa, southwest of the Sanggar Peninsula and Mount Tambora.

References

Bays of Indonesia
Landforms of Sumbawa
Landforms of West Nusa Tenggara